Claypool may refer to:

Places
In the United States:
Claypool, Arizona
Claypool, Indiana
Claypool, Logan County, West Virginia
Claypool, Summers County, West Virginia

Other uses
Claypool (surname)
Claypool Comics